Prominent alumni of Bloomsburg University of Pennsylvania in Bloomsburg, Pennsylvania include:

Lou Barletta, former member of the US House of Representatives (PA-11).
Dennis Bermudez, UFC fighter.
Gabriel J. Campana.
Adam Clay, USL soccer player.
Joe Colone (1924-2009), one-year NBA player for the New York Knicks (1948–1949).
Chuck Daly (1930-2009), NBA coach, and head coach of the first USA Dream Team.
Jahri Evans, Offensive guard for the New Orleans Saints, Super Bowl XLIV Champion (2010).
Matt Feiler, Offensive Guard for the Pittsburgh Steelers.
Percy Wilfred Griffiths (1893–1983), U.S. Representative for the 15th District of Ohio (1943–1949).
Tim Holden, U.S. Representative for the 17th District of Pennsylvania (1993-2013).
Skënder Hyseni.
Isaac Clinton Kline (1858–1947), U.S. Representative for the 16th District of Pennsylvania (1921–1923).
Jessica Leccia, actress best known as Natalia Rivera on Guiding Light.
John Vandling Lesher (1866–1932), U.S. Representative for the 16th District of Pennsylvania (1913–1921).
Kelly Lewis, former member of Pennsylvania House of Representatives.
Danny Litwhiler (1916-2011), record-setting MLB baseball player for Boston Braves and other teams. 
Frederick William Magrady (1863–1954), U.S. Representative for the 17th District of Pennsylvania (1925–1933).
Charles Clarence Pratt (1854–1916), U.S. Representative for the 14th District of Pennsylvania (1909–1911).
David R. Millard.
Phyllis Mundy, State Representative for Pennsylvania's 120th legislative district (1991-current).
Rodney Pocceschi, Virginia Beach police officer killed in the line of duty in 2003.
Mark S. Schweiker, former governor of Pennsylvania.
Frank Sheptock, football coach at Bloomsburg University, All-American linebacker for Bloomsburg in the 1980s.
Brian Sims, Democratic member of the Pennsylvania House of Representatives in the 182nd district.
Jimmi Simpson, Emmy nominated film and television actor.
Bob Tucker, a former NFL player (1970–1980).
John Willis (born 1952), American-Israeli  basketball player
Erin O'Connor (born 1992), American-Irish English Teacher

References

 
Bloomsburg University of Pennsylvania